DJ Reach (born Semu A. Namakajo in 1979) is an American music producer and DJ. He is considered a prominent figure in the New York City and Las Vegas club scene and first gained significant notice after being the official DJ for Last Call with Carson Daly.

Biography
DJ Reach began his music career as a disc jockey at the age of 13 after receiving inspiration from the film Juice. In 2001 DJ Reach graduated from Wesleyan University.

After interning for his mentor DJ Stretch Armstrong of "The Stretch Armstrong and Bobbito Show" on WKCR, Reach learned the importance of being unique and creating his own mix.

In August 2012, Reach made headlines after Kanye West joined him in the DJ booth at Ph-D nightclub in New York City. West played a series of unreleased tracks, stoking public excitement for his album Cruel Summer

His open format style and ear for mixing eclectic DJ sets eventually led to his residency at high-profile night clubs, corporate, celebrity events including Pink Elephant, PM, TAO, Prime and Marque; Playboy's Super Bowl Bash, NASCAR/Nextel Cup Series Championship Party, Madonna's Confessions tour after party and Jay-Z's infamous 24 hour Hanger tour.

References

External links

1979 births
Wesleyan University alumni
American DJs
Living people